The Stade de la Frontière is a multi-purpose stadium in Esch-sur-Alzette, Luxembourg.  It is currently used mostly for football matches and is the home stadium of Jeunesse Esch.  The stadium holds 4,000 people.

International matches
The stadium has hosted a number of home international games for Luxembourg in place of the national stadium, which was the Stade Josy Barthel, in Luxembourg City.

References

External links

Jeunesse Esch
Frontiere, Stade de la
Frontiere, Stade de la
Multi-purpose stadiums